The Horse Lake First Nation is a First Nations band government west of Hythe in northwestern Alberta, Canada. It consists of the Beaver and Cree people. It is a party to Treaty 8, and is a member of the Western Cree Tribal Council. Despite being a member of the Western Cree regional council, the Horse Lake First Nation is linguistically and culturally a part of the Danezaa or "Beavers".

, the total population of the band was 1,053 people, of whom 466 (44%) lived on reserve or on Crown land and the rest lived off reserve.

Since 2002, students who are members of the Horse Lake band have been educated in the Alberta provincial education system, specifically the Peace Wapiti School Division (PWSD), rather than separate reserve schools, with the cost being borne by Indigenous and Northern Affairs Canada. However in 2012, this arrangement was put in doubt when the budget for non-Aboriginal "at risk" students received was more than doubled by the provincial government from $2.2 million to $5.1 million per year. Under the terms of the contract between the Western Cree and PWSD, the band must pay the difference between what the provincial government pays for band members, and what the federal government pays for non-Aboriginals. This implies an additional $3,000 per student.

References 

Dane-zaa
First Nations governments in Alberta